Jesús Francisco López García (born March 18, 1997, in Empalme, Sonora) is a Mexican footballer who plays for Sonora.

References

1997 births
Living people
Association football forwards
Cimarrones de Sonora players
Ascenso MX players
Liga Premier de México players
Tercera División de México players
Footballers from Sonora
People from Empalme, Sonora
Mexican footballers